Sven Köhler may refer to:
 Sven Köhler (footballer, born 1966)
 Sven Köhler (footballer, born 1996)